Sri Guru Teg Bahadur State University of Law is a State University located in Kairon village, Tarn Taran district, Punjab, India

References

Universities in Punjab, India
2020 establishments in Punjab, India
Educational institutions established in 2020